The Turbați is a right tributary of the river Blahnița in Romania. It flows into the Blahnița in Hăiești.

References

Rivers of Romania
Rivers of Gorj County